The Costa Book Award for Poetry, formerly known as the Whitbread Award (1971-2006), was an annual literary award for poetry collections, part of the Costa Book Awards. The award concluded in 2022.

Recipients 
Costa Books of the Year are distinguished with a bold font and a blue ribbon. Award winners are listed in bold.

See also 

 Costa Book Award for Biography
 Costa Book Award for Children's Book
 Costa Book Award for First Novel
 Costa Book Award for Novel
 Costa Book Award for Short Story
 Costa Book Awards

References

External links 

 Official website

English-language literary awards
Awards established in 1971
Poetry awards
Costa Book Awards